Patrick Quinn (26 April 1936 – 13 July 2020) was a Scottish football player and manager.

Career
Quinn began his career in League football at Motherwell under the management of Bobby Ancell where he played alongside other "Ancell's Babes" such as Ian St John. Quinn established himself as a scheming inside-forward before moving to Blackpool in 1962. A year later, he returned to Scotland to join Hibernian and was a key component of the team's midfield under Jock Stein and Bob Shankly. He was a finalist in the 1968–69 Scottish League Cup.

He finished his league career at East Fife, whom he went on to manage. He also coached FH.

Quinn played four times for Scotland between 1961 and 1962. Quinn also represented the Scottish Football League XI six times.

Death
Quinn died on 13 July 2020, aged 84.

References

External links

1936 births
2020 deaths
Place of death missing
Blackpool F.C. players
East Fife F.C. managers
East Fife F.C. players
Hibernian F.C. non-playing staff
Bridgeton Waverley F.C. players
Hibernian F.C. players
Motherwell F.C. players
Footballers from Glasgow
Scottish Football League players
Scottish football managers
Scottish expatriate football managers
Scottish footballers
Scotland international footballers
English Football League players
Association football inside forwards
Scottish Football League representative players
Scotland junior international footballers
Scottish Junior Football Association players
Scottish Football League managers
Fimleikafélag Hafnarfjarðar managers